

Current major manufacturers

Current minor manufacturers

 9FF (2001–present)
 Aaglander (2003–present)
 AC Schnitzer (1987–present)
 Alpina (1965–present)
 Apollo Automobil (2016-present)
 Arden
 Artega (2016-present)
 Artemis (2021–present)
 BAT
 Binz
 Bitter (1971–present)
 Borgward (1924–1963; 2008–present)
 Brabus (1977–present)
 Carbodies
 Carlsson
 CityEl (1987–present)
 Citysax
 e.Go
 Elektron Motors (2021-present)
 Elia
 Gumpert (2004–present)
 Isdera (1983–present)
 Jetcar (2000–present)
 Keinath (1996–present)
 Lotec (1981–present)
 Mansory (1989–present)
 Maybach (1909-present)
 Pegasus (1995–present)
 RG - Roland Gumpert (2017–present)
 Ruf Automobile (1982–present)
 Weineck Engineering
 Wiesmann (1988–present)
 Yes! (1999–present)

Former manufacturers

A–C
 AAA (1919)
 Aachener (1902)
 AAG (1900–1901)
 Adler (1900–1939)
 Alan (1923–1925)
 AFM (1949–1953)
 AGA (1919–1929)
 Alfi (1921–1924)
 Alliance (1904–1905)
 Allright (1908–1913)
 Altmann (1905–1907)
 Amor (1924–1925)
 Amphicar (1961–1968)
 Ansbach (1910–1913)
 Anker (1919–1920)
 Apollo (1910–1927)
 Argus (1902–1910)
 Arimofa (1921–1922)
 Artega (2006–2012) (2015– )
 Atlantic (1921–1923)
 Auto Union (1932–1962)
 AWS (1971–1974)
 Baer (1921–1924)
 Beaufort (1901–1906)
 Beckmann (1900–1926)
 BEF (1907–1913)
 Benz (1883–1926)
 Benz Söhne (1906–1926)
 Boes (1903–1906)
 Borgward (1939–1961)
 Brennabor (1908–1934)
 Brütsch (1952–1958)
 Butz (1934)
 Certus (1928–1929)
 Champion (1948–1954)
 Cito (1905–1909)
 Club (1922–1924)
 Colibri (1908–1911)
 Cudell (1899–1908)
 Cyklon (1902–1929)

D–F
 Daimler (1885–1889)
 Deutz (1907–1911)
 Diabolo (1922–1927)
 Diana (1922–1923)
 Dixi (1904–1928)
 DKW (1928–1966)
 DMG (1890–1902)
 Dehn (1924)
 Dinos (1920–1924)
 Dürkopp (1898–1927)
 Dux (1905–1926)
 EAM (1990)
 Ego (1921–1926)
 Ehrhardt (1905–1924)
 Ehrhardt-Szawe (1924–1925)
 Eisenach (1898–1903)
 EMW (1945–1956)
 Erdmann (1904–1908)
 Excelsior-Mascot (1911–1922)
 Exor (1923)
 Express (1901–1910)
 Fadag (1921–1925)
 Fafag (1921–1923)
 Fafnir (1908–1926)
 Falcon (1921–1926)
 Falke (1899–1908)
 Faun (1921–1928)
 Favorit (1908–19
 Feldmann (1905–1912)
 Flitzer (1948–1953)
 Ferbedo (1923–1925)
 Fiat-Neckar (1957–1971)
 Framo (1932–1937)
 Freia (1922–1927)
 Fuldamobil (1950–1960)
 Fulmina (1913–1926)

G–K
 Gaggenau (1905–1911)
 Gasi (1921)
 Geha (1910–1923)
 Glas (1955–1969)
 Goggomobil (1955–1969)
 Goliath (1931–1963)
 Grade (1921–1926)
 Gridi (1923–1924)
 Gutbrod (1904–2005)
 HAG (1922–1925)
 HAG-Gastell (1925–1927)
 Hanomag (1925–1952)
 Hansa (1906–1939)
 Hataz (1921–1925)
 Hartge (1985–2019)
 Hawa (1923–1925)
 Heim (1921–1926)
 Heinkel  (1955–1958)
 Henschel (1899–1906)
 Hexe (1905–1907)
 Hildebrand (1922–1924)
 Hoffmann (1954–1955)
 Horch (1900–1939)
 IFA (1948–1956)
 Induhag (1922)
 Joswin (1920–1924)
 Juho (1922)
 Kenter (1923–1925)
 Kleinschnittger (1950–1957)
 Koco (1921–1926)
 Komet (1922–1924)
 Komnick (1907–1927)
 Kondor (1902–1904)
 Körting (1922–1924)
 Kroboth (1954–1955)
 Kühlstein (1898–1902)

L–O
 Leichtauto (1924)
 Lindcar (1922–1925)
 Lipsia (1922–1924)
 Lloyd (1906–1914; 1950–1963)
 Loreley (1906–1928)
 Lux (1897–1902)
 Mada (1947–1949)
 MAF (1908–1921)
 Maico (1955–1958)
 Maja (1923–1924)
 Mannesmann (1923–1929)
 Mars (1906–1908)
 Maurer-Union (1900–1910)
 Mauser (1923–1929)
 MCA (1962–1964)
 Melkus (1969–1980; 2006–2012)
 Mercedes (1901–1926)
 Merkur (1985–1989)
 Meyra (1948–1956)
 Minimus (1921–1924)
 Mock (1924)
 Mölkamp (1923–1926)
 Morgan (1924–1925)
 MWD (1911–1912)
 Nacke (1901–1913)
 NAG (1901–1934)
 Neckar (1957–1971)
 NSU (1905–1929; 1958–1977)
 NSU-Fiat (1929–1957)
 Nug (1921–1925)
 Omikron (1922–1925)
 Orient Express (1895–1903)
 Oryx (1907–1922)

P–S

 Pawi (1921)
 Peter & Moritz AG (1919–1925)
 Phänomen (1907–1927)
 Piccolo (1904–1912)
 Pilot (1923–1925)
 Pinguin (1953–1955)
 Pluto (1924–1927)
 Podeus (1911–1914)
 Presto (1901–1927)
 Priamus (1901–1923)
 Primus (1899–1903)
 Protos (1899–1926)
 Rabag / Rabag-Bugatti (1922–1926)
 Röhr (1927–1935)
 Rollfix (1933–1936)
 Rumpler (1921–1926)
 Sablatnig-Beuchelt (1925–1926)
 Sachsenring (1956–1959)
 SB / Slaby-Beringer (1920–1924)
 Scheibler (1900–1907)
 Securus (1906)
 Seidel-Arop (1925–1926)
 Selve (1919–1929)
 S.H.W. (1924–1925)
 Simson / Simson Supra (1911–1933)
 Smart (1994–2019)
 Solidor (1905–1907)
 Solomobil (1921–1923)
 Sperber (1911–1919)
 Sphinx (1920–1925)
 Staiger (1923–1924)
 Standard Superior (1933–1935)
 Staunau (1950–1951)
 Steiger (1914–1926)
  (1904–1911)
 Stoewer (1899–1940)
 Stolle (1924–1927)
 Szawe (1920–1924)

T–Z
 Taunus (1907–1909)
 Tempo (1933–1956)
 Thurner (1970–1973)
 Titan
 Tornax (1934–1937)
 Tourist (1907–1920)
 Trabant (1957–1991)
 Trippel (1934–1944)
 Turbo (1923–1924)
 Utilitas (1920–1921)
 Victoria (1900–1909; 1957–1958)
 Voran (1926–1928)
 Veritas (1947–1953)
 Vogtland (1910–1912)
 Wanderer (1911–1942)
 Wartburg (1898–1904, 1956–1990)
 Wendax (1950–1951)
 Wenkelmobil (1904–1907)
 Wesnigk (1920–1925)
 Westfalia (1906–1914)
 Windhoff (1908–1914)
 Wittekind (1922–1925)
 Zender (1985-c.1990)
 Zündapp (1956–1958)
 Zwickau (1956–1959)

See also
 Automotive industry in Germany
 Automotive industry
 List of automobile marques
 List of motorcycle manufacturers
 List of truck manufacturers

References

Sources 
 Georgano, Nick (Ed.). The Beaulieu Encyclopedia of the Automobile. Chicago: Fitzroy Dearborn, 2000. 
 Mazur, Eligiusz (Ed.). World of Cars 2006 / 2007: Worldwide Car Catalogue.  Warsaw: Media Connection, 2006. ISSN 1734-2945

Germany
Automobile manufacturers